Cirie may refer to:

Cirié, a town in Italy
Cirie (novel), a 2002 novel by Mildred Savage
Cirie Fields (born 1970), contestant on Survivor: Panama, Survivor: Micronesia, Survivor: Heroes vs. Villains, and Survivor: Game Changers